Külmaallika is a village in Kuusalu Parish, Harju County, in northern Estonia.

References

Villages in Harju County